Lake Ingram, also sometimes spelled as Inghram, is a natural freshwater lake on the west side of Orlando, Florida, in Orange County, Florida. This lake is shaped like an arrowhead and much of it is surrounded by land that floods easily. To the east side of the lake is Florida State Road 429, a toll highway. Some residential areas are now bordering it.

This lake has no public boat docks, no public swimming areas and only a little public access from Avalon Road, which borders its eastern tip.

References

Lakes of Orange County, Florida